During the history of Canadian politics, thirteen  minority governments have been elected at the federal level. There have also been two minority governments resulting from governments being replaced between elections, for a total of fifteen federal minority governments in thirteen separate minority parliaments. There have been historical cases where the governing party had fewer than half of the seats but had the support of independents who called themselves members of the party; these cases are not included, as there was never any serious chance of the government falling.

In a minority situation, governments must rely on the support of other parties to stay in power, providing less stability than a majority government. At the federal level, no minority government (excepting the odd case of the 14th) has lasted a standard four-year term. Most minority governments have lasted less than two years. The average duration of completed minorities in Canada is 479 days or approximately 1 year, 140 days counting only that part of the 14th Parliament that was a minority, or 1 year, 207 days counting the entire duration of it.

In addition to the minorities below, the 2nd Canadian Parliament was a minority for 56 days under prime minister Alexander Mackenzie after he took power from John A. Macdonald following the Pacific Scandal. However, this event is generally not noted because Parliament was never in session while Mackenzie was in power. The fifteenth federal minority parliament was elected in the 2021 election.

In the United Kingdom and elsewhere in the world, minority governments are referred to as hung parliaments.

Alexander Mackenzie
Alexander Mackenzie replaced John A. Macdonald in 1873 after the latter was involved in the Pacific Scandal. Mackenzie became the prime minister of a minority government, but he immediately called an election in which he then won a majority.

William Lyon Mackenzie King

Seats short of a majority 1921: 0. Term of office 1,339 days. (Due to seat fluctuations, the government was not in a minority for the entire duration of the parliament.)
Seats short of a majority 1925: 23. Term of office 204 days.

Liberal minority after the 1921 election. Initially, the Liberal Party had the exact number of seats required for a majority. It maintained that majority until December 1923 when it lost two seats in by-elections returning it to a minority. It continued as a minority until November 1924 when the Liberals gained a seat in a by-election and became a majority again. Therefore, although this particular Parliament lasted for 3 years and 7 months, for only about half of that time (one year and ten months) was it an actual minority Parliament.

Liberal minority after the 1925 election- This was a truly minority Parliament throughout its life. The election resulted in the incumbent Liberal government of Mackenzie King being reduced to 101 seats in the House of Commons, while the opposition Conservatives took the most seats (116). All others won 26 seats, 24 of them won by the Progressives. King chose to carry on in government and face the new Parliament seeking its confidence. From January to July 1926, King's government sustained such confidence with the support of most of the Progressives (although in many cases only by one or two votes). On June 26, after virtually losing control of the House and sustaining a loss on a sub-amendment to a censure motion and facing a final vote on the main censure motion, King asked the Governor-General for dissolution and was refused. King therefore immediately resigned and the Conservative leader Arthur Meighen agreed to form a government which itself, although larger, was also a minority one. However, a few days later on July 1, 1926, the new Meighen minority government was defeated on a matter of confidence (by one vote). Meighen then requested and obtained a dissolution from the Governor-General. Therefore, the Parliament arising from this election was throughout a minority one.

Quasi-minorities
After the 1926 election, the Liberal party proper was seven seats short of a majority. However, eight MPs were elected as Liberal-Progressive members and usually voted with the Liberals giving the government a working majority.

As well, following the 1945 election the official Liberal candidates did not win a majority of seats leaving the King government five seats short of a majority. However, the election of eight "Independent Liberal" MPs, most of whom did not run as official Liberals because of their opposition to conscription (see Conscription Crisis of 1944), as well as one Liberal-Progressive, gave the King government an effective working majority in parliament. Most of the Independent Liberal MPs joined (or re-joined) the Liberal caucus following World War II when the conscription issue became moot.

Arthur Meighen

Seats short of a majority 1926: 8. Term of office 88 days.
Arthur Meighen led two short-lived Conservative governments. The first was a majority at the end of the 13th parliament, elected in 1917 under the Unionist ticket. The second government was a minority in 1926. Meighen's conservatives won a plurality of the seats in the previous 1925 election, however, a government was instead formed via an agreement between the Liberals and Progressives. After King's Liberals had lost the progressives' support he requested parliament to be dissolved by the governor-general, Lord Byng, resulting in the King–Byng Affair. The resulting conflict caused King to shortly resign as prime minister, and Byng subsequently appointed Meighen as prime minister. On July 1, 1926, a week after Byng appointed him prime minister, Meighen lost a confidence vote in the House of Commons resulting in the 1926 election.

1Not elected as such

John Diefenbaker

Seats short of a majority 1957: 22. Term of office 177 days.
Seats short of a majority 1962: 17. Term of office 203 days.
After 22 years of Liberal rule, the Progressive Conservative Party of Canada, led by John Diefenbaker, unexpectedly won a minority government in the 1957 election. Prime Minister Louis St. Laurent, sensing the mood of the nation, stepped aside and let Diefenbaker govern. Diefenbaker needed the support of the Social Credit Party of Canada and three independents to get any legislation passed. This minority lasted only a few months. The seminal moment was Lester Pearson announcing to Diefenbaker that because of the slight decline in economic performance, and the fact that the Liberals had won the popular vote, he should hand power back to the Liberals. Diefenbaker, in a rage, launched a two-hour speech condemning the Liberals, and revealing a document from the previous government predicting the economic decline. Diefenbaker would soon call an election, and win the largest majority government in Canadian history.

The Diefenbaker government ended badly with party infighting, a poor economy and controversies over relations with the United States during the Kennedy administration. In the 1962 election, the Tories won only a minority. This time, the momentum was with the Liberals and the imploding Tories were all but incapable of governing due largely to a split in Diefenbaker's Cabinet over the deployment of Bomarc missiles in Canada. The government was defeated in the House on a confidence issue on February 5, 1963, forcing the 1963 federal election which the Tories lost.

Lester B. Pearson

Seats short of a majority 1963: 5. Term of office 2 year, 123 days (854 days).
Seats short of a majority 1965: 2. Term of office 2 years, 136 days (866 days).
In the 1963 election, the Liberals, led by Lester B. Pearson, were also unable to win a majority. The next 548 days were productive ones, however, a close working relationship between the Liberals and the New Democratic Party (NDP) resulted in the introduction of Canada's health care system, the Canadian flag, and the Canada Pension Plan. In 1965, Pearson asked the Governor General to dissolve Parliament in an attempt to win a majority, but the makeup of parliament after the 1965 election remained almost the same, leading to almost three more years of a productive alliance between the Liberals and NDP.

Canada's constitutional convention dealing with minority governments was altered in 1968 when Pearson's government was unexpectedly defeated on a matter of confidence. While this should have led to an immediate dissolution of parliament, none of the parties were ready, and Pearson was in the process of being replaced as leader of the Liberals. By mutual agreement among the party leaders, a new motion was passed that retroactively declared that the budgetary matter on which the government was defeated was not a matter of confidence, setting a new precedent.

Pierre E. Trudeau

Seats short of a majority 1972: 232. Term of office 1 year, 170 days (535 days).
In the 1972 election, the Liberals under Pierre Trudeau won only two seats more than the Tories. It was the second election for Trudeau as party leader. However, even though the Liberals entered the election strong in the polls, the Trudeaumania buzz had all but ended, and the party was further damaged by a weak economy. With few issues to campaign on and one of the weakest campaigns in Canadian history, they were again forced to rely on the NDP to remain in power. In this instance, the NDP demanded the creation of Petro-Canada among other things to support the Liberals. The government fell on May 8, 1974, on a sub-amendment to the budget (thus a question of confidence). The Trudeau Liberals won a large majority government in the resulting 1974 federal election.

2Speaker was elected as independent

Joe Clark

Seats short of a majority 1979: 6. Term of office 186 days.
To improve his situation slightly, Clark supported the selection of Liberal member James Jerome, House Speaker in the 30th Parliament, to serve as speaker once again, and this was seconded by Opposition Leader Pierre Trudeau. (Starting in 1986, the speaker was elected in a secret ballot vote by the members of the house.)

While the Liberals had first the Progressives and later the NDP to support them in minority situations, the Progressive Conservatives had little experience attracting support as a minority government. Seven months after the 1979 election which ended 11 years of Trudeau Liberal government, the Tory government of Joe Clark was defeated in motion of no confidence in the government and its budget moved by Bob Rae of the NDP and supported by the Liberals.

Clark might have prevented this defeat had his government agreed to support the Quebec based Social Credit Party in its bid to maintain official party status—the party's seat total had fallen to six seats as a result of the 1979 election. However, Clark had hoped to follow the precedent set by Diefenbaker and pledged to "govern as if" he had a majority and then advance to a majority government through a new election without having to make deals with smaller parties. He also wished to win seats in Quebec in his own right and saw the conservative, populist Social Credit Party as an obstacle rather than a potential partner. As a result of Clark's refusal to extend recognition to Social Credit, its MPs abstained in the Non-Confidence vote that brought down the Clark government on December 13, 1979, a defeat caused by the Social Credit abstention and the absence of a handful of Tory MPs due to illness or travel. The dissolution was portrayed as a blunder and the budget Clark fought 1980 election on was unpopular with voters. On February 18, 1980, the PCs were defeated by the Trudeau Liberals who were elected to a majority government.

Paul Martin

Seats short of a majority 2004: 20. Term of office 1 year, 133 days (498 days).
Although the 2004 federal election was initially expected to be easy for Martin to win a fourth consecutive Liberal majority government, during the campaign many began instead to predict a far closer result. Mostly due to the sponsorship scandal, polls started to indicate the possibility of a minority government for the Liberals, or even a minority Conservative government, which in turn created speculation of coalitions with the other parties. Towards the end of the campaign, the Liberals were running attack ads against the Conservatives. In the end, the Liberals fared better than the final opinion polls had led them to fear, but not well enough to win a majority.

On May 10, 2005, a motion was passed by the opposition parties in the House of Commons to instruct a committee to call for the dissolution of the government. The Conservatives and Bloc Québécois defeated the Liberals and the NDP by 153 votes to 150. Although the motion was technically nothing more than a procedural instruction to a committee, the Conservatives and Bloc demanded the resignation of the government. There is ongoing debate between parties and constitutional experts as to whether or not this was a vote of no confidence.

On May 19, 2005, the House voted on two budget bills, deemed unquestionable matters of confidence. With the support of two independents and Conservative MP Belinda Stronach—who crossed the floor to the Liberals and was appointed Minister of Human Resources and Skills Development, becoming a member of the Liberal cabinet—the result of the vote was a tie, which was broken in favour of the government by the Speaker of the House of Commons, resulting in a vote of 153–152.

On November 24, 2005, the opposition Conservatives introduced a motion of no confidence. The motion was seconded by the NDP. On November 28, the government was defeated by a margin of 171 to 133, having been defeated by the united opposition forces (Conservatives, NDP, and Bloc Québécois). In the early morning of November 29, 2005, Martin went to Governor General Michaëlle Jean to ask for the dissolution of parliament and a January 23, 2006, election.

Stephen Harper

 Seats short of a majority 2006: 31. Term of office 2 years, 207 days (937 days).
 Seats short of a majority 2008: 12. Term of office 2 years, 142 days (872 days).

Although several public opinion polls predicted that the 2006 election would result in either a strong Conservative minority or a slight majority, the Liberals enjoyed a last-minute surge but were unable to overtake the Conservatives. However, the surge did result in the smallest minority government in Canadian history, with the smallest percentage of government seats ever and the largest number of seats short of a majority. All parties held the balance of power, the Liberal party with 102 seats, the Bloc Québécois with 51 seats, and the NDP with 29 seats. André Arthur, a popular radio host from Quebec City, was the only independent elected. As Liberal Peter Milliken was reelected as Speaker, the Conservatives now effectively held a minority only 29 seats short of a majority as the Speaker traditionally votes only to break a tie and always in favour of the status quo. Thus, the Conservatives held a majority together with any one of the opposition parties, assuming no defections. This status was changed midway through the 39th parliament when maverick MP Garth Turner was ousted from the Conservative caucus for allegedly violating "caucus confidentiality".

Stephen Harper led a minority Conservative government and was sworn in as Prime Minister on February 6. Paul Martin resigned as leader of the Liberal Party on March 18 to quell any rumours that he might run in any future election. From March 18 to December 2, 2006, Bill Graham was the interim leader of the Liberal party. Stéphane Dion won the leadership convention on December 2, and from then served as the leader of the opposition.

The initial results of the 2006 election indicated that the Conservatives would fall 31 seats short of a majority. However, after the election but before the new Parliament took office, Liberal David Emerson crossed the floor to join the Conservatives and Stephen Harper's cabinet amidst some controversy. This increased the size of the Conservative caucus to 125 seats, only 30 seats short of a majority.

Parliament was dissolved on September 7, 2008, ending the longest-running minority government between the return of writs and dissolution. On October 14, Harper's Conservative Party was re-elected with a plurality of seats, though still 12 seats short of a majority. It is the first time since Pearson's 1965 minority that a minority government was re-elected as such.

The 40th Parliament was dissolved following the government's defeat in a motion of no confidence, however, the Conservatives were re-elected to a majority government on May 2, 2011. Excluding the odd case of the 14th Parliament, Harper led the government through two longest-lasting federal minority governments in Canadian history and was also the first prime minister to win a federal election (by majority or minority) after winning two minority governments (consecutive or not).

Justin Trudeau

 Seats short of a majority 2019: 13. Term of office 1 year, 253 days (619 days). He won 157 seats, 13 seats away from a majority.
 Seats short of a majority 2021: 10. Term of office  ( days) (as of ). He won 160 seats, 10 seats away from a majority. He still currently serves his third mandate as prime minister of Canada.
In the 2019 election, the Liberals under Mr. Justin Trudeau won the most seats, though still 13 seats short of a majority, and formed a minority government. It was the second election for Trudeau as party leader. 

The 43rd Parliament was dissolved on August 15, 2021. On September 20, Trudeau's Liberal Party was re-elected, though still 10 seats short of a majority, and formed a second minority government. It is the first time since Harper's 2008 minority that a minority government was re-elected as such. On March 22, 2022, the New Democratic Party (NDP) agreed to a confidence-and-supply agreement with the Liberals.

Minority governments by term of office

See also
 Minority governments in Canada, for a list of provincial minority governments in Canada.

References

Bibliography

Minority Government, by Stephen Azzi, D. Kwavnick

Politics of Canada
Canada, Federal

fr:Gouvernements minoritaires au Canada